City Lights is an album by organist Jimmy McGriff recorded in late 1980 and early 1981 and released on the Jazz America Marketing (JAM) label.

Reception 

Allmusic's Scott Yanow said: "he returned to prime form on this album. ... The repertoire is fairly typical for soul-jazz, including "Teach Me Tonight" and some funky blues, and the music is pleasing".

Track listing
All compositions by Jimmy McGriff except where noted
 "My Way" (Claude François, Jacques Revaux, Paul Anka) – 5:31
 "Funky Accents" – 3:21
 "Brickyard" – 9:51
 "City Lights" – 4:11
 "Teach Me Tonight" (Gene De Paul, Sammy Cahn) – 8:37
 "Jimmy's Room" – 5:57

Personnel
Jimmy McGriff – organ
Danny Moore  – trumpet
Leo Johnson / Bill Easley – alto saxophone
Harold Vick – tenor saxophone
Wayne Boyd / Jimmy Ponder – guitar
Alfred Johnson – bass
Victor Jones / Idris Muhammad − drums

References

Jimmy McGriff albums
1981 albums
Albums produced by Bob Porter (record producer)
Albums recorded at Van Gelder Studio